Ann was launched at Fowey in 1801. She did not appear in the registers before 1808, though there were mentions of her in ship arrival and departure data before that. She traded widely and was effectively last listed in 1815.

Career
Ann first appeared in Lloyd's Register (LR) in the volume for 1808, and in the Register of Shipping (RS) in 1809.

Fate
Ann was last listed in LR in 1815, and in RS in 1822, with data stale since 1815. She was last surveyed in 1814.

Citations

References
 

1801 ships
Age of Sail merchant ships of England